Buck Pond is a small lake north-northeast of the hamlet of Moshier Falls in Herkimer County, New York. It drains west via an unnamed creek that flows into the West Branch Oswegatchie River.

See also
 List of lakes in New York

References 

Lakes of New York (state)
Lakes of Herkimer County, New York